Balmain is an electoral district of the Legislative Assembly of the Australian state of New South Wales in Sydney's Inner West. It is currently represented by Jamie Parker of the Greens New South Wales.

Balmain includes the suburbs and localities of Annandale, Balmain, Balmain East, Birchgrove, Forest Lodge, Glebe, Glebe Island, Leichhardt, Lilyfield, Rozelle, White Bay and parts of Camperdown and Ultimo.

History
Balmain was established in 1880 and from 1882, it elected two members, from 1885 it elected three members and from 1889 until 1894 it elected four members simultaneously.  Voters cast a vote for each vacancy and the leading candidates were elected.  In 1894 it was split into Balmain North, Balmain South,  Annandale and  Leichhardt, each electing one member.  In 1904 with the downsizing of the Assembly after Federation, Balmain North and part of Balmain South were combined into a single electorate, electing one member.  In 1920, parts of the electoral districts of Balmain, Annandale, Camperdown, Darling Harbour, Glebe and Rozelle were combined to create a new incarnation of Balmain, which elected five members by proportional representation.  This was replaced by single member electorates of Balmain, Annandale, Glebe and Rozelle for the 1927 election. Balmain was abolished in 1991, being replaced by Port Jackson. It was recreated for the 2007 election, taking in large parts of the abolished district of Port Jackson (the Sydney CBD and Pyrmont, which were previously in Port Jackson, became part of the new Electoral district of Sydney).

Historically, Balmain has been a working-class seat and very safe for —at the 1978 election, Labor won an 84.2 percent two-party vote. However, as with several inner-city seats, demographic change and the rise of the  has seen a strong Green vote in Balmain since the party first contested the seat from the seat's recreation at the 2007 election. Following the 2019 election, it is considered a safe Greens seat.

Members for Balmain

Election results

Notes

References

Electoral districts of New South Wales
1880 establishments in Australia
Constituencies established in 1880

1894 disestablishments in Australia
Constituencies disestablished in 1894

1904 establishments in Australia
Constituencies established in 1904

1991 disestablishments in Australia
Constituencies disestablished in 1991

2007 establishments in Australia
Constituencies established in 2007